Wild Things 2 is a 2004 erotic thriller film directed by Jack Perez and starring Susan Ward, Leila Arcieri, Isaiah Washington and Linden Ashby. It is a sequel to Wild Things (1998) and the second film in the Wild Things series.

The film premiered on Encore Mystery on March 6, 2004, and was released on DVD on April 20. The film was followed by a sequel Wild Things: Diamonds in the Rough (2005).

Plot
Brittney Havers, a South Florida high school senior, lives with her wealthy stepfather, Niles Dunlap, after her mother ran her car off the road in "Gator Alley" and was presumably eaten by alligators a year earlier. When Dunlap is killed in a private plane crash, his will calls for Brittney to receive a small stipend until she finishes college, after which she will receive only $25,000 a year for life from the estate. The rest of Dunlap's assets, totaling $70 million, are to be left to a corporate trust, unless a blood heir can be found.

Brittney's brash, relatively poor classmate Maya King suddenly claims to be Dunlap's illegitimate daughter as the result of her mother's extramarital affair. She is ordered by a judge to submit to a DNA test, the result of which proves she is Dunlap's child.

At the Dunlap home, Brittney hears a noise on her way to the wine cellar but it turns out to just be rats. Suddenly Maya appears and the girls reveal they are lovers before being joined by Dr. Julian Haynes, who had arranged the DNA test. The trio are in cahoots, running a scam to secure and share Dunlap's fortune.

Insurance investigator Terence Bridge, investigating the circumstances of the plane crash, finds out from Dunlap's medical records that Dunlap had scarlet fever as a child, one of the side effects of which can be sterility, and asks Dr. Haynes how Dunlap could have fathered a child. Dr. Haynes gets nervous about the plot unraveling and contacts Maya. He agrees to meet her and Brittney that night at the docks, where Maya shoots him. The two girls dispose of his body in Gator Alley.

After Bridge learns the entire affair was planned, he shows up at the Dunlap home and demands half the money in return for not going to the police. Brittney, refusing to give up any of the money, gets a gun and points it at Bridge, but instead kills Maya. She tells Bridge that he has to earn his half. He loads Maya's body into the trunk of his car and he and Brittney drive off to dispose of it.

When they stop at a traffic light, Brittney gets out of the car and walks away as a police car pulls up behind them. Bridge can do nothing but drive away when the traffic light turns green and the police car honks at him to get moving. Brittney phones in an anonymous tip that Bridge's car trunk has Maya's body in it. He is soon arrested and jailed. A videotape from the Dunlap home security system shows Bridge demanding half of the inheritance money from Brittney and Maya.

Later, Brittney flies off in a private plane with the very much alive Dunlap, who had faked his own death to escape prosecution for misappropriating millions of dollars of corporate funds to pay his gambling debts, and also to avoid the Cuban gambler Cicatriz, to whom he still owed millions. Brittney and Dunlap don parachutes, planning to bail out over swampland and disappear together. As Dunlap is poised to bail out, Brittney reveals that she packed his chute with newspaper and pushes him from the plane to his death. She then bails out, landing safely in the swamp, where her mother, also very much alive, is waiting for her in a swamp boat.

It is revealed that Brittney and her mother orchestrated everything, including the deaths of Brittney's co-conspirators, in order to steal Dunlap's fortune, and they relax in the sun on a tropical island. Brittney comes down the stairs of their villa overlooking the ocean with two drinks and hands one to her mother. As Brittney watches intently, her mother takes a sip and remarks that the drink is strong. Brittney replies, with a wry smile, "They do make them strong here, don't they?" With that, it is left to the audience to decide whether or not Brittney has poisoned the drink.

Cast
 Susan Ward as Brittney Havers
 Leila Arcieri as Maya King
 Isaiah Washington as Terence Bridge
 Linden Ashby as Detective Michael Morrison
 Anthony Denison as Niles Dunlap
 Joe Michael Burke as Dr. Julian Haynes
 Katie Stuart as Shannon
 Faith Salie as Lacey
 Marc Macaulay as Jayson 
 Ski Carr as Cicatriz
 Dylan Kussman as Irvin Brillman  
 Kimberly Atkinson as Teri Breur   
 Ron Dean as Judge Ruben
 Adrianna Banovich as Action News Anchor  
 Kathy Neff as Brittney's Mother

References

External links
 
 

2000s erotic thriller films
2004 direct-to-video films
2004 films
American LGBT-related films
Bisexuality-related films
Direct-to-video sequel films
Direct-to-video erotic thriller films
Television sequel films
Films directed by Jack Perez
Films set in Miami
Films shot in Florida
Films shot in Miami
Sony Pictures direct-to-video films
2000s American films